Harold Cornelius Bradley  (November 25, 1878 – January 4, 1976) was a professor of biochemistry at the University of Wisconsin. Bradley relocated to Madison in 1906, where he was one of the first three staff members of the new University of Wisconsin Medical School. Bradley was an avid skier, he skied solo across the Sierra range in 1920 and skied until age 85; he was inducted into the Madison Sports Hall of Fame and the National Ski Hall of Fame. He also served as an honorary president of the Sierra Club. Bradley retired in 1948 and relocated to California. He died in Berkeley, California.

Family
Bradley was the grandson of the American missionary to Siam Dan Beach Bradley, the son of English professor and Thai linguist Cornelius Beach Bradley, and the father of geology professor Charles C. Bradley. He was married to Mary Josephine Crane (1886–1952).

Legacy
Bradley was instrumental in encouraging outdoor education through the Wisconsin Hoofers Clubs at the University of Wisconsin; a lounge at the Wisconsin Union is named for him. One of UW-Madison's two residential learning communities (the other Chadbourne) is named after Harold C. Bradley.

See also 
Harold C. Bradley House

References

External links
 Biography of Harold C. Bradley

People from Oakland, California
Scientists from Madison, Wisconsin
University of Wisconsin–Madison faculty
American educational theorists
1878 births
1976 deaths
Scientists from California
20th-century American biochemists
Sierra Club awardees